Tripteroides (Ficalbia) dofleini is a species of zoophilic mosquito belonging to the genus Tripteroides. It is endemic to Sri Lanka

References

External links
Genus Tripteroides

dofleini